This is a (partial) list of things named after Stanislaw Ulam, a 20th-century Polish-American mathematician who also worked in physics and biological sciences:

Computer science
Stan, probabilistic programming language

Mathematics
Borsuk–Ulam theorem
Erdős–Ulam problem
Fermi–Pasta–Ulam–Tsingou problem
Hyers–Ulam–Rassias stability
 Kuratowski–Ulam theorem
Mazur–Ulam theorem
Ulam's conjecture
Collatz conjecture
 Kelly–Ulam conjecture, or reconstruction conjecture
Ulam's packing conjecture
Ulam matrix
Ulam numbers
Ulam spiral
Ulam's game
Ulam–Warburton cellular automaton

Physics
 Fermi–Pasta–Ulam–Tsingou problem
 Fermi–Ulam model
Teller–Ulam design

See also

Ulam